John Holmes House, also known as the Cresse–Holmes House, is located at 504 U.S. Route 9 North in the Cape May Court House section of Middle Township in Cape May County, New Jersey. It was added to the National Register of Historic Places on June 12, 1979, for its significance in vernacular Georgian architecture. It was documented by the Historic American Buildings Survey in 1992.

History
The house was originally thought to have been built in 1755 by Robert Cresse. Later research has shown that the oldest part of the house was built  by John Cresse, his father. The "newer" portion of the house was built by Robert Morris Holmes, son of John Holmes, in 1830. The house has been owned by the Cape May County Historical and Genealogical Society since 1976.

Museum
The house is now operated as the Museum of Cape May County, and features an 18th-century period kitchen, bedroom and 1830 dining room and a Victorian sitting room. Other exhibits include a doctor's room, a military room, Native American room and maritime artifacts.

See also
National Register of Historic Places listings in Cape May County, New Jersey
List of museums in New Jersey

References

External links
 
 
 Museum of Cape May County - official site

Middle Township, New Jersey
Houses on the National Register of Historic Places in New Jersey
Georgian architecture in New Jersey
Houses completed in 1755
Houses in Cape May County, New Jersey
Museums in Cape May County, New Jersey
History museums in New Jersey
Historic American Buildings Survey in New Jersey
National Register of Historic Places in Cape May County, New Jersey
New Jersey Register of Historic Places